The 17th annual Berlin International Film Festival was held from 23 June – 4 July 1967. The Golden Bear was awarded to the Belgian film Le départ directed by Jerzy Skolimowski.

Jury
The following people were announced as being on the jury for the festival:
 Thorold Dickinson, director, screenwriter and producer (United Kingdom) - Jury President
 Rüdiger von Hirschberg, producer (West Germany)
 Knud Leif Thomsen, director and screenwriter (Denmark)
 Michel Aubriant, journalist and writer (France)
 Sashadhar Mukerjee, producer (India)
 Aleksandar Petrović, director and screenwriter (Yugoslavia)
 Willard Van Dyke, filmmaker and photographer (United States)
 Manfred Delling, journalist and writer (West Germany)

Films in competition
The following films were in competition for the Golden Bear award:

Key
{| class="wikitable" width="550" colspan="1"
| style="background:#FFDEAD;" align="center"| †
|Winner of the main award for best film in its section
|}

Awards

The following prizes were awarded by the Jury:
 Golden Bear: Le départ by Jerzy Skolimowski
 Silver Bear for Best Director: Živojin Pavlović for Buđenje pacova
 Silver Bear for Best Actress: Edith Evans for The Whisperers
 Silver Bear for Best Actor: Michel Simon for Le vieil homme et l'enfant
 Silver Bear Extraordinary Jury Prize: 
 Michael Lentz for Alle Jahre wieder
 Éric Rohmer for La Collectionneuse
Youth Film Award
Best Feature Film Suitable for Young People: La Collectionneuse by Éric Rohmer
FIPRESCI Award
Alle Jahre wieder by Ulrich Schamoni
Interfilm Award
Here's Your Life by Jan Troell and The Two of Us by Claude Berri
Interfilm Award – Honorable Mention
The Whisperers by Bryan Forbes
OCIC Award 
The Whisperers by Bryan Forbes
C.I.C.A.E. Award
Here's Your Life by Jan Troell
C.I.D.A.L.C. Award
Here's Your Life by Jan Troell
C.I.D.A.L.C. Gandhi Award
The Two of Us by Claude Berri
UNICRIT Award
Le départ by Jerzy Skolimowski

References

External links
 17th Berlin International Film Festival 1967
1967 Berlin International Film Festival
Berlin International Film Festival:1967 at Internet Movie Database

17
1967 film festivals
1967 in West Germany
1960s in West Berlin